The Cherry Orchard is a play by Anton Chekhov.

The Cherry Orchard may also refer to several works based on the play:

 The Cherry Orchard (1974 film), Australian TV film
 The Cherry Orchard (1981 film), British TV film
 Sakura no Sono, a Japanese manga series adapted into a 1990 film released with the English title The Cherry Orchard
 The Cherry Orchard (1999 film), International co-production